Gallup station is an Amtrak train station at 201 East Highway 66 in downtown Gallup, New Mexico. It is the second busiest station in the state, with more than 16,000 boardings and alightings in 2014.

Historic use
The two-story station was built in the Mission Revival style through 1917, opening on January 31, 1918, with no celebration due to World War I. Then one of a series of Santa Fe railroad station hotels built across the southwestern and central United States by the Fred Harvey Company was connected to the depot in 1923. The fabulous El Navajo Hotel was designed by the master architect Mary Colter, blending Pueblo Revival and Art Deco styles, and decorated using Navajo sand paintings. The hotel was demolished in a process starting on June 11, 1957 to widen Route 66.  The depot reopened later as an unstaffed Amtrak station.

Gallup Cultural Center
The city renovated the building in 1996 to serve as the Gallup Cultural Center to be operated by the Southwest Indian Foundation. In addition to a passenger waiting area, it is also home to the Gallup Visitor Center, which relocated to the station in 2004.

The Cultural Center houses a Storyteller Museum and Gallery of the Masters showcasing Native American Arts & Culture; the Kiva Cinema; and a coffee shop. and a gift shop featuring jewelry, pottery, rugs and blankets, and other pieces by local Acoma, Zuni, Navajo, Hopi and other Native American artisans. The Museum includes exhibits on weaving, sandpainting, silversmithing, trains, and Historic Route 66.

A statue of Navajo Chief Manuelito by Tim Washburn stands in a plaza front of the Gallup Cultural Center. Next to the plaza is the "Navajo Code Talker", a 12-foot bronze statue by famous Navajo/Ute sculptor Oreland Joe. The Navajo Code Talkers played a major role during World War II because the Japanese never cracked their language "code".

The station is unique in that a fence guards the platform from the rest of the station. This is to prevent people getting onto BNSF's triple-tracked, high-speed, very busy Southern Transcon main line.

Routes
Southwest Chief

References

External links

 Gallup Amtrak Station (USA Rail Guide -- Train Web)
 Gallup Cultural Center

Amtrak stations in New Mexico
Gallup, New Mexico
Atchison, Topeka and Santa Fe Railway stations in New Mexico
Buildings and structures on U.S. Route 66
Transportation in McKinley County, New Mexico
Atchison, Topeka and Santa Fe Railway hotels
Buildings and structures in McKinley County, New Mexico
Pueblo Revival architecture in New Mexico
Pueblo Deco architecture
Railway stations in the United States opened in 1918
1918 establishments in New Mexico